Dan and Stacy Chariton are screenwriters of the 2013 film The English Teacher, starring Julianne Moore, Nathan Lane, Greg Kinnear, Michael Angarano and Lily Collins, which premiered at the 2013 Tribeca Film Festival.  They met as undergraduates at the USC School of Cinema-Television, where they studied under professor John Furia, Jr.

Their first creative collaboration was a 14-issue run of "The Silver Surfer," published by Marvel Comics. Their storyline portrayed the Silver Surfer as a terrifying and inscrutable cosmic being, "kidnapping" gifted human children to protect them from an imminent global catastrophe.

The English Teacher is their first produced film.  They are married and live in Los Angeles.

References

 https://www.nytimes.com/2013/05/24/movies/the-english-teacher-starring-julianne-moore.html?searchResultPosition=3
 https://www.marvel.com/comics/creators/335/stacy_weiss
 https://www.marvel.com/comics/creators/336/dan_chariton
 https://tribecafilm.com/festival/archive/513a8421c07f5d47130004f1-the-english-teacher
 https://www.imdb.com/name/nm0152911/?ref_=ttfc_fc_cl_t116

Screenwriters from California
Year of birth missing (living people)
Place of birth missing (living people)
Writers from Los Angeles
USC School of Cinematic Arts alumni
Living people